Matthew Hatchette (born May 1, 1974) is a former a professional American football player who played wide receiver for six regular seasons for the Minnesota Vikings, the New York Jets, and the Jacksonville Jaguars. During his career, he caught 60 passes for 887 yards and six touchdowns, averaging 14.8 yards per catch.  His playoff statistics are six receptions for 39 yards and two touchdowns. In 2002, he was signed to the Oakland Raiders, but was released in the pre-season due to a serious shoulder injury. He also played one season for the Amsterdam Admirals, an NFL Europe team, in 2003. He was named to the All-NFL Europe Team that year and broke the League's receiving records in number of passes caught, yardage, and touchdowns. He signed with the Jacksonville Jaguars in 2003. In Jacksonville, he played in six games, catching 15 passes for 203 yards and two touchdowns. He was released following the 2003 season and retired shortly thereafter.

A Langston University graduate, Hatchette initially attended Mercyhurst College in Erie, Pennsylvania. He attended Jefferson Area High School, where he played quarterback and was also a member of the basketball team. His retired #5 jersey is on display in the school cafeteria, along with an article about when he was drafted. He is believed to be the only Jefferson Falcon in any sport to have his number retired.

Currently, Matthew lives in Los Angeles pursuing an acting and producing career. He has been in three small films, most notably his most recent "The Take" starring John Leguizamo, Rosie Perez, & Tyrese Gibson; he was also the Executive Producer, with the film being produced by his own film production company, Hatchet Films.  Rosie Perez was nominated for best supporting actress by the Independent Spirit Awards. In 2008, he appeared on the sitcom How I Met Your Mother in the episode "No Tomorrow" as a bartender.

Recently, Hatchette appeared on Bravo TV's reality program The Millionaire Matchmaker and appeared in The T.O. Show playing basketball with Owens.

References

External links
 Official website

1974 births
Living people
Sportspeople from Ashtabula, Ohio
African-American players of American football
American football wide receivers
Langston Lions football players
Mercyhurst University alumni
Minnesota Vikings players
New York Jets players
Oakland Raiders players
Jacksonville Jaguars players
Amsterdam Admirals players
People from Jefferson, Ohio
21st-century African-American sportspeople
20th-century African-American sportspeople